The Leicester and District Football League is an association football competition based in England. The league has three divisions, of which the highest, the Premier Division, sits at level 12 of the English football league system and is a feeder to the Leicestershire Senior League. There are also two reserve divisions which are not part of the league system.

Clubs are allowed to pay players at this level, however in the 2005–06 season, the only Premier Division side that paid players, Barlestone St Giles, came second, allowing Cosby United to take the crown.  Cosby were unable to enter the Leicestershire Senior League, however, as their facilities did not meet Senior League standards.

Member clubs 2018-19
Premier Division

Braunstone Trinity
Burbage Old Boys
Dunton & Broughton Utd
Fleckney Athletic
Glenfield Town
Houghton Rangers
Huncote
Iqra
Kibworth Town
Northfield Emerald 2013
St Patricks
Whetstone Athletic

Division One
AFC Andrews
Dunton & Broughton Utd Reserves
Forest East
Glen Villa
Griff & Coton FC
Guru Nanak Gurdwara (GNG) Reserves
Label Apeel
Leicester Three Lions
Magna 73 Reserves
North Kilworth Reserves
Old Aylestone
Queniborough

Division Two
Cosby United Development
Dunton & Broughton United Development
Fleckney Athletic Reserves
Glenfield Town Reserves
Huncote Reserves
Kibworth Town Reserves
Old Aylestone Reserves
Scraptoft United
St Patricks Reserves
Studs FC
Thurnby Willows
Welford Victoria

References

External links
 

 
Football leagues in England